The Breakup Playlist is a 2015 Filipino musical romantic drama film starring Piolo Pascual and Sarah Geronimo. It is written by Antonette Jadaone and directed by Dan Villegas. It was released on July 1, 2015 by Star Cinema and Viva Films.

Plot 
Starting from the present time and moves back in the past, the movie tells the story of an aspiring professional singer and a rock singer who collaborates in a song. As they work on their song, they start to develop feelings for each other. But soon, different challenges like their families and their pride will get in-between them. Can they have a happy ending after all this?

Cast

Main Cast

Piolo Pascual as Gino Avila
Sarah Geronimo as Trixie David

Supporting cast
Rio Locsin as Marissa David
Dennis Padilla as Joey David
Maris Racal as Janine
Jan Marini as Adi 
Diego Loyzaga as Joshua
Teddy Corpuz as Toffer
Jett Pangan as Lester
Cris Villonco as Jing
Basti Artadi as Caloy
Annicka Dolonius as Ria
Anna Luna as Cathy
Badji Mortiz as Saul

Special Participation
Jamie Rivera

Soundtrack 
On June 30, 2015, Star Records released the official soundtrack album. Few weeks after, the album peaked at #1 on iTunes Philippines album chart and at #9 on Billboard World Albums.

The album includes the hit "Paano Ba Ang Magmahal?" sung by Piolo Pascual and Sarah Geronimo, it was written by Yeng Constantino and Jonathan Manalo. It was first recorded by Liezel Garcia and Erik Santos in 2012. "Wag Na Wag Mong Sasabihin" sung by Sarah Geronimo, written and originally popularized by Kitchie Nadal, "With A Smile" sung by Piolo Pascual, originally performed by Eraserheads, “Ikaw Lamang” sung by Geronimo and Pascual, "Patawarin" sung by Pascual, “Bida” and
“Nagsimula Sa Puso” sung by Geronimo, the album also includes minus one of “Paano Ba Ang Magmahal."

Reception

Box-office
The film was shown in just 180 cinemas nationwide but bested other international films on its first day opening gross with Php 15 million. The movie ruled the box-office chart taking the first spot over Hollywood movies. Due to positive reviews from the viewers, it was shown in more than 200 cinemas nationwide on its second day. The movie producers have not announced the official weekend gross of the movie making the online viewers abuzz. Since the movie bested its toughest competitor 'Terminator: Genesys' with around 1.5 million dollars or 65 million pesos, it is expected that the movie has reached 100 million peso mark after its 5th day showing in cinemas given the positive online reviews from the critics and pictures from the viewers lining up the cinemas up to its last full show of the day.

On July 8, 2015, the producers announced that after 7 days, the movie has already breached 100 million peso mark. After five weeks in theaters, the movie grossed over Php 150 million pesos nationwide.

Critical reception

Due to its outstanding merit, “The Breakup Playlist” has received Grade A rating from the Cinema Evaluation Board and received positive reviews from critics.

According to Rappler.com, " The Breakup Playlist is a film that juggles commercial demands with the impulse for creative change. Sure, it may not be perfect, it may not dent the system or cause a revolution, but the film, with all its heart and soul in all the right places, is proof that even in the much maligned arena of escapist entertainment, there is hope. There is substance."

References

External links 
 

2015 films
Philippine romantic drama films
2015 romantic drama films
Star Cinema films
Viva Films films
2010s Tagalog-language films
2010s English-language films
2015 multilingual films
Philippine multilingual films